Diego José Rangel Monge (born 23 June 1978 in Almendralejo, Badajoz, Extremadura) is a Spanish retired professional footballer who played as a central defender.

External links

1978 births
Living people
People from Almendralejo
Spanish footballers
Footballers from Extremadura
Association football defenders
La Liga players
Segunda División players
Segunda División B players
CF Extremadura footballers
Real Madrid Castilla footballers
Real Valladolid Promesas players
CD Logroñés footballers
Mérida UD footballers
Palamós CF footballers
UE Figueres footballers
SD Huesca footballers
Girona FC players
Extremadura UD footballers
UE Costa Brava players